Carlen or Carlén is a Swedish surname that may refer to

Carlen surname
Eric Anders Carlen, American mathematician
Jim Carlen (1933–2012), American football player, coach, and college athletics administrator
Rolando Carlen (born 1966), Argentine football manager and former player

Carlén surname
Adam Carlén (born 2000), Swedish footballer
Annette Carlén-Karlsson (born 1956), Swedish speed skater
Emilie Flygare-Carlén (1807–1892), Swedish novelist
Gustaf Carlén (1890–1975), Swedish long-distance runner
Hilda Carlén (born 1991), Swedish football goalkeeper 
Octavia Carlén (1828 – 1881),Swedish writer
Per Carlén (born 1960), Swedish handball player and coach

See also

Carle, surnames
Carle (given name)
Carlee
Carlena
Carlens
Carles (name)
Carlon
Carlen v Drury
Karlen

Swedish-language surnames